Grace Episcopal Church is a historic Episcopal church located at 419 S. Main Street in Lexington, Davidson County, North Carolina.  It was built in 1902, and is a one-story, Late Gothic Revival style red brick building.  It features a steeply pitched gable roof, lancet-arched doors and windows, buttresses, a front corner bell tower, and a three-part stained-glass window produced by Tiffany Studios in 1918.

It was added to the National Register of Historic Places in 2006.

References

External links
Grace Episcopal Church website

Episcopal church buildings in North Carolina
Churches in Davidson County, North Carolina
Churches on the National Register of Historic Places in North Carolina
Gothic Revival church buildings in North Carolina
Churches completed in 1902
20th-century Episcopal church buildings
National Register of Historic Places in Davidson County, North Carolina